Little Fighter Online (LFO, Chinese: 小朋友齊打交 Online) was a fighting game for Microsoft Windows. It was popular at launch in Hong Kong, but has shown a rapid decline in popularity since. The gameplay itself was based on the earlier Little Fighter 2 game, which shares many of the same features. The game was produced by Marti Wong (involved in all the Little Fighter games) and Oscar Chu, a Chinese MMO developer.

In 2021, an unofficial English version was created. The version allows to replay the entire Story of the Little Fighters in English.

Servers 
Little Fighter Online (also known as LFO) was launched and developed by U1 Game and played on several servers. The game started operation on 22 October 2004 and closed on 27 January 2016. Players complained about the game have many bugs, lags and susceptible to players cheating. Version 14 was the last version ever released and players have stopped playing due to instability and unreliability.

References

External links 
 Little Fighter – EMPIRE (A Little Fighter Fansite)

2004 video games
Massively multiplayer online role-playing games
Free online games
Video games developed in Hong Kong
Windows games
Windows-only games